Little Beaver Township is a township in Lawrence County, Pennsylvania, United States. The population was 1,227 at the time of the 2020 census, a decline from the figure of 1,411 tabulated in 2010.

History
Old Homestead was listed on the National Register of Historic Places in 1980.

Geography

Demographics
As of the census of 2000, there were 1,310 people, 451 households, and 362 families residing in the township.

The population density was 64.1 people per square mile (24.8/km2). There were 502 housing units at an average density of 24.6/sq mi (9.5/km2).

The racial makeup of the township was 99.39% White, 0.23% African American, and 0.38% from two or more races. Hispanic or Latino of any race were 0.61% of the population.

There were 451 households, out of which 38.4% had children under the age of eighteen living with them; 68.5% were married couples living together, 8.2% had a female householder with no husband present, and 19.7% were non-families. 16.2% of all households were made up of individuals, and 6.2% had someone living alone who was sixty-five years of age or older.

The average household size was 2.90 and the average family size was 3.28.

In the township the population was spread out, with 30.3% under the age of eighteen, 6.4% from eighteen to twenty-four, 30.5% from twenty-five to forty-four, 23.0% from forty-five to sixty-four, and 9.8% who were sixty-five years of age or older. The median age was thirty-four years.

For every one hundred females there were 95.5 males. For every one hundred females who were aged eighteen and over, there were 99.8 males.

The median income for a household in the township was $35,368, and the median income for a family was $40,795. Males had a median income of $33,929 compared with that of $21,023 for females.

The per capita income for the township was $14,689.

Roughly 13.8% of families and 15.4% of the population were below the poverty line, including 24.7% of those who were under the age of eighteen and 4.5% of those who were aged sixty-five or older.

References

Populated places established in 1796
Townships in Lawrence County, Pennsylvania
1796 establishments in Pennsylvania